HD 82886 is an evolved subgiant star in the constellation Leo Minor. With an apparent magnitude 7.63, it is too faint to be seen with the unaided eye.

Planetary system
A planet 1.3 times the mass of Jupiter and orbiting at an approximate distance of 1.65 astronomical units (AU) every 705 days was discovered in 2011.

HD 82886, and its planet HD 82886b, were chosen as part of the 2019 NameExoWorlds campaign organised by the International Astronomical Union, which assigned each country a star and planet to be named. HD 82886 was assigned to Albania.  The winning proposal named the star Illyrian after the ancient people of the Balkans region (including Albania), and the planet Arber after the medieval term for the inhabitants of Albania.

References

Durchmusterung objects
082886
047087
Leo Minor
G-type subgiants
Planetary systems with one confirmed planet
Illyrian